The Eritrean National Road Race Championships are held annually to decide the cycling champions in both the road race and time trial discipline, across various categories.

Men

Elite

U23

Women

See also
Eritrean National Time Trial Championships
National Road Cycling Championships

References

National road cycling championships
Cycle races in Eritrea